Marilyn M. White is an American folklorist who researches African American folklore and family folklore. She conducts research in Little Cayman. White served as the president of the American Folklore Society. She is a long-time president of the Association of African and African American Folklorists. White is an ex officio member of the board of trustees of the American Folklife Center. 

White completed a B.A. in English from Hampton University. She earned a M.A. in folklore from Indiana University. White completed a PhD in anthropology (folklore) from the University of Texas at Austin. 

She was a professor of anthropology at Kean University from 1985 to 2011. She previously taught at Western Kentucky University for eight years.

References 

Living people
Year of birth missing (living people)
Place of birth missing (living people)
Presidents of the American Folklore Society
Hampton University alumni
Indiana University alumni
University of Texas at Austin alumni
Kean University faculty
Western Kentucky University faculty
American women anthropologists
Women folklorists
20th-century African-American academics
20th-century American academics
21st-century African-American academics
21st-century American academics
20th-century African-American women
21st-century African-American women